Kanem is one of three departments which make up the region of Kanem in Chad. The capital is Mao.

The department is divided into 4 sub-prefectures:

Kekedina
Mao
Melea
Wadjigui

Departments of Chad
Kanem Region